The Soloneț is a right tributary of the river Prut in Romania. It flows into the Prut in the village Soloneț.

References

Rivers of Romania
Rivers of Iași County